The United States Bill of Rights comprises the first ten amendments to the United States Constitution. Proposed following the often bitter 1787–88 debate over the ratification of the Constitution and written to address the objections raised by Anti-Federalists, the Bill of Rights amendments add to the Constitution specific guarantees of personal freedoms and rights, clear limitations on the government's power in judicial and other proceedings, and explicit declarations that all powers not specifically granted to the federal government by the Constitution are reserved to the states or the people. The concepts codified in these amendments are built upon those in earlier documents, especially the Virginia Declaration of Rights (1776), as well as the Northwest Ordinance (1787), the English Bill of Rights (1689), and Magna Carta (1215).

Largely because of the efforts of Representative James Madison, who studied the deficiencies of the Constitution pointed out by anti-federalists and then crafted a series of corrective proposals, Congress approved twelve articles of amendment on September 25, 1789, and submitted them to the states for ratification. Contrary to Madison's proposal that the proposed amendments be incorporated into the main body of the Constitution (at the relevant articles and sections of the document), they were proposed as supplemental additions (codicils) to it. Articles Three through Twelve were ratified as additions to the Constitution on December 15, 1791, and became Amendments One through Ten of the Constitution. Article Two became part of the Constitution on May 5, 1992, as the Twenty-seventh Amendment. Article One is still pending before the states.

Although Madison's proposed amendments included a provision to extend the protection of some of the Bill of Rights to the states, the amendments that were finally submitted for ratification applied only to the federal government. The door for their application upon state governments was opened in the 1860s, following ratification of the Fourteenth Amendment. Since the early 20th century both federal and state courts have used the Fourteenth Amendment to apply portions of the Bill of Rights to state and local governments. The process is known as incorporation.

There are several original engrossed copies of the Bill of Rights still in existence. One of these is on permanent public display at the National Archives in Washington, D.C.

Background

Philadelphia Convention

Prior to the ratification and implementation of the United States Constitution, the thirteen sovereign states followed the Articles of Confederation, created by the Second Continental Congress and ratified in 1781. However, the national government that operated under the Articles of Confederation was too weak to adequately regulate the various conflicts that arose between the states. The Philadelphia Convention set out to correct weaknesses of the Articles that had been apparent even before the American Revolutionary War had been successfully concluded.

The convention took place from May 14 to September 17, 1787, in Philadelphia, Pennsylvania. Although the Convention was purportedly intended only to revise the Articles, the intention of many of its proponents, chief among them James Madison of Virginia and Alexander Hamilton of New York, was to create a new government rather than fix the existing one. The convention convened in the Pennsylvania State House, and George Washington of Virginia was unanimously elected as president of the convention. The 55 delegates who drafted the Constitution are among the men known as the Founding Fathers of the new nation. Thomas Jefferson, who was Minister to France during the convention, characterized the delegates as an assembly of "demi-gods." Rhode Island refused to send delegates to the convention.

On September 12, George Mason of Virginia suggested the addition of a Bill of Rights to the Constitution modeled on previous state declarations, and Elbridge Gerry of Massachusetts made it a formal motion. However, after only a brief discussion where Roger Sherman pointed out that State Bills of Rights were not repealed by the new Constitution, the motion was defeated by a unanimous vote of the state delegations. Madison, then an opponent of a Bill of Rights, later explained the vote by calling the state bills of rights "parchment barriers" that offered only an illusion of protection against tyranny. Another delegate, James Wilson of Pennsylvania, later argued that the act of enumerating the rights of the people would have been dangerous, because it would imply that rights not explicitly mentioned did not exist; Hamilton echoed this point in Federalist No. 84.

Because Mason and Gerry had emerged as opponents of the proposed new Constitution, their motion—introduced five days before the end of the convention—may also have been seen by other delegates as a delaying tactic. The quick rejection of this motion, however, later endangered the entire ratification process. Author David O. Stewart characterizes the omission of a Bill of Rights in the original Constitution as "a political blunder of the first magnitude" while historian Jack N. Rakove calls it "the one serious miscalculation the framers made as they looked ahead to the struggle over ratification".

Thirty-nine delegates signed the finalized Constitution. Thirteen delegates left before it was completed, and three who remained at the convention until the end refused to sign it: Mason, Gerry, and Edmund Randolph of Virginia. Afterward, the Constitution was presented to the Articles of Confederation Congress with the request that it afterwards be submitted to a convention of delegates, chosen in each State by the people, for their assent and ratification.

Anti-Federalists

Following the Philadelphia Convention, some leading revolutionary figures such as Patrick Henry, Samuel Adams, and Richard Henry Lee publicly opposed the new frame of government, a position known as "Anti-Federalism". Elbridge Gerry wrote the most popular Anti-Federalist tract, "Hon. Mr. Gerry's Objections", which went through 46 printings; the essay particularly focused on the lack of a bill of rights in the proposed Constitution. Many were concerned that a strong national government was a threat to individual rights and that the President would become a king. Jefferson wrote to Madison advocating a Bill of Rights: "Half a loaf is better than no bread. If we cannot secure all our rights, let us secure what we can." The pseudonymous Anti-Federalist "Brutus" (probably Robert Yates) wrote,

He continued with this observation:

Federalists
Supporters of the Constitution, known as Federalists, opposed a bill of rights for much of the ratification period, in part because of the procedural uncertainties it would create. Madison argued against such an inclusion, suggesting that state governments were sufficient guarantors of personal liberty, in No. 46 of The Federalist Papers, a series of essays promoting the Federalist position. Hamilton opposed a bill of rights in The Federalist No. 84, stating that "the constitution is itself in every rational sense, and to every useful purpose, a bill of rights." He stated that ratification did not mean the American people were surrendering their rights, making protections unnecessary: "Here, in strictness, the people surrender nothing, and as they retain everything, they have no need of particular reservations." Patrick Henry criticized the Federalist point of view, writing that the legislature must be firmly informed "of the extent of the rights retained by the people ... being in a state of uncertainty, they will assume rather than give up powers by implication." Other anti-Federalists pointed out that earlier political documents, in particular the Magna Carta, had protected specific rights. In response, Hamilton argued that the Constitution was inherently different:

Massachusetts compromise

In December 1787 and January 1788, five states—Delaware, Pennsylvania, New Jersey, Georgia, and Connecticut—ratified the Constitution with relative ease, though the bitter minority report of the Pennsylvania opposition was widely circulated. In contrast to its predecessors, the Massachusetts convention was angry and contentious, at one point erupting into a fistfight between Federalist delegate Francis Dana and Anti-Federalist Elbridge Gerry when the latter was not allowed to speak. The impasse was resolved only when revolutionary heroes and leading Anti-Federalists Samuel Adams and John Hancock agreed to ratification on the condition that the convention also propose amendments. The convention's proposed amendments included a requirement for grand jury indictment in capital cases, which would form part of the Fifth Amendment, and an amendment reserving powers to the states not expressly given to the federal government, which would later form the basis for the Tenth Amendment.

Following Massachusetts' lead, the Federalist minorities in both Virginia and New York were able to obtain ratification in convention by linking ratification to recommended amendments. A committee of the Virginia convention headed by law professor George Wythe forwarded forty recommended amendments to Congress, twenty of which enumerated individual rights and another twenty of which enumerated states' rights. The latter amendments included limitations on federal powers to levy taxes and regulate trade.

A minority of the Constitution's critics, such as Maryland's Luther Martin, continued to oppose ratification. However, Martin's allies, such as New York's John Lansing, Jr., dropped moves to obstruct the Convention's process. They began to take exception to the Constitution "as it was", seeking amendments. Several conventions saw supporters for "amendments before" shift to a position of "amendments after" for the sake of staying in the Union. Ultimately, only North Carolina and Rhode Island waited for amendments from Congress before ratifying.

Article Seven of the proposed Constitution set the terms by which the new frame of government would be established. The new Constitution would become operational when ratified by at least nine states. Only then would it replace the existing government under the Articles of Confederation and would apply only to those states that ratified it.

Following contentious battles in several states, the proposed Constitution reached that nine-state ratification plateau in June 1788. On September 13, 1788, the Articles of Confederation Congress certified that the new Constitution had been ratified by more than enough states for the new system to be implemented and directed the new government to meet in New York City on the first Wednesday in March the following year. On March 4, 1789, the new frame of government came into force with eleven of the thirteen states participating.

New York Circular Letter

In New York, the majority of the Ratifying Convention was Anti-Federalist and they were not inclined to follow the Massachusetts Compromise. Led by Melancton Smith, they were inclined to make the ratification of New York conditional on prior proposal of amendments or, perhaps, insist on the right to secede from the union if amendments are not promptly proposed. Hamilton, after consulting with Madison, informed the Convention that this would not be accepted by Congress.

After ratification by the ninth state, New Hampshire, followed shortly by Virginia, it was clear the Constitution would go into effect with or without New York as a member of the Union. In a compromise, the New York Convention proposed to ratify, feeling confident that the states would call for new amendments using the convention procedure in Article V, rather than making this a condition of ratification by New York. John Jay wrote the New York Circular Letter calling for the use of this procedure, which was then sent to all the States. The legislatures in New York and Virginia passed resolutions calling for the convention to propose amendments that had been demanded by the States while several other states tabled the matter to consider in a future legislative session. Madison wrote the Bill of Rights partially in response to this action from the States.

Proposal and ratification

Anticipating amendments

The 1st United States Congress, which met in New York City's Federal Hall, was a triumph for the Federalists. The Senate of eleven states contained 20 Federalists with only two Anti-Federalists, both from Virginia. The House included 48 Federalists to 11 Anti-Federalists, the latter of whom were from only four states: Massachusetts, New York, Virginia and South Carolina.
Among the Virginia delegation to the House was James Madison, Patrick Henry's chief opponent in the Virginia ratification battle. In retaliation for Madison's victory in that battle at Virginia's ratification convention, Henry and other Anti-Federalists, who controlled the Virginia House of Delegates, had gerrymandered a hostile district for Madison's planned congressional run and recruited Madison's future presidential successor, James Monroe, to oppose him. Madison defeated Monroe after offering a campaign pledge that he would introduce constitutional amendments forming a bill of rights at the First Congress.

Originally opposed to the inclusion of a bill of rights in the Constitution, Madison had gradually come to understand the importance of doing so during the often contentious ratification debates. By taking the initiative to propose amendments himself through the Congress, he hoped to preempt a second constitutional convention that might, it was feared, undo the difficult compromises of 1787, and open the entire Constitution to reconsideration, thus risking the dissolution of the new federal government. Writing to Jefferson, he stated, "The friends of the Constitution, some from an approbation of particular amendments, others from a spirit of conciliation, are generally agreed that the System should be revised. But they wish the revisal to be carried no farther than to supply additional guards for liberty." He also felt that amendments guaranteeing personal liberties would "give to the Government its due popularity and stability". Finally, he hoped that the amendments "would acquire by degrees the character of fundamental maxims of free government, and as they become incorporated with the national sentiment, counteract the impulses of interest and passion". Historians continue to debate the degree to which Madison considered the amendments of the Bill of Rights necessary, and to what degree he considered them politically expedient; in the outline of his address, he wrote, "Bill of Rights—useful—not essential—".

On the occasion of his April 30, 1789 inauguration as the nation's first president, George Washington addressed the subject of amending the Constitution. He urged the legislators,

Madison's proposed amendments
James Madison introduced a series of Constitutional amendments in the House of Representatives for consideration. Among his proposals was one that would have added introductory language stressing natural rights to the preamble. Another would apply parts of the Bill of Rights to the states as well as the federal government. Several sought to protect individual personal rights by limiting various Constitutional powers of Congress. Like Washington, Madison urged Congress to keep the revision to the Constitution "a moderate one", limited to protecting individual rights.

Madison was deeply read in the history of government and used a range of sources in composing the amendments. The English Magna Carta of 1215 inspired the right to petition and to trial by jury, for example, while the English Bill of Rights of 1689 provided an early precedent for the right to keep and bear arms (although this applied only to Protestants) and prohibited cruel and unusual punishment.

The greatest influence on Madison's text, however, was existing state constitutions. Many of his amendments, including his proposed new preamble, were based on the Virginia Declaration of Rights drafted by Anti-Federalist George Mason in 1776. To reduce future opposition to ratification, Madison also looked for recommendations shared by many states. He did provide one, however, that no state had requested: "No state shall violate the equal rights of conscience, or the freedom of the press, or the trial by jury in criminal cases." He did not include an amendment that every state had asked for, one that would have made tax assessments voluntary instead of contributions. Madison proposed the following constitutional amendments:

Crafting amendments
Federalist representatives were quick to attack Madison's proposal, fearing that any move to amend the new Constitution so soon after its implementation would create an appearance of instability in the government. The House, unlike the Senate, was open to the public, and members such as Fisher Ames warned that a prolonged "dissection of the constitution" before the galleries could shake public confidence. A procedural battle followed, and after initially forwarding the amendments to a select committee for revision, the House agreed to take Madison's proposal up as a full body beginning on July 21, 1789.

The eleven-member committee made some significant changes to Madison's nine proposed amendments, including eliminating most of his preamble and adding the phrase "freedom of speech, and of the press". The House debated the amendments for eleven days. Roger Sherman of Connecticut persuaded the House to place the amendments at the Constitution's end so that the document would "remain inviolate", rather than adding them throughout, as Madison had proposed. The amendments, revised and condensed from twenty to seventeen, were approved and forwarded to the Senate on August 24, 1789.

The Senate edited these amendments still further, making 26 changes of its own. Madison's proposal to apply parts of the Bill of Rights to the states as well as the federal government was eliminated, and the seventeen amendments were condensed to twelve, which were approved on September 9, 1789. The Senate also eliminated the last of Madison's proposed changes to the preamble.

On September 21, 1789, a House–Senate Conference Committee convened to resolve the numerous differences between the two Bill of Rights proposals. On September 24, 1789, the committee issued this report, which finalized 12 Constitutional Amendments for House and Senate to consider. This final version was approved by joint resolution of Congress on September 25, 1789, to be forwarded to the states on September 28.

By the time the debates and legislative maneuvering that went into crafting the Bill of Rights amendments was done, many personal opinions had shifted. A number of Federalists came out in support, thus silencing the Anti-Federalists' most effective critique. Many Anti-Federalists, in contrast, were now opposed, realizing that Congressional approval of these amendments would greatly lessen the chances of a second constitutional convention. Anti-Federalists such as Richard Henry Lee also argued that the Bill left the most objectionable portions of the Constitution, such as the federal judiciary and direct taxation, intact.

Madison remained active in the progress of the amendments throughout the legislative process. Historian Gordon S. Wood writes that "there is no question that it was Madison's personal prestige and his dogged persistence that saw the amendments through the Congress. There might have been a federal Constitution without Madison but certainly no Bill of Rights."

Ratification process
The twelve articles of amendment approved by congress were officially submitted to the Legislatures of the several States for consideration on September 28, 1789. The following states ratified some or all of the amendments:
 New Jersey: Articles One and Three through Twelve on November 20, 1789, and Article Two on May 7, 1992
 Maryland: Articles One through Twelve on December 19, 1789
 North Carolina: Articles One through Twelve on December 22, 1789
 South Carolina: Articles One through Twelve on January 19, 1790
 New Hampshire: Articles One and Three through Twelve on January 25, 1790, and Article Two on March 7, 1985
 Delaware: Articles Two through Twelve on January 28, 1790
 New York: Articles One and Three through Twelve on February 24, 1790
 Pennsylvania: Articles Three through Twelve on March 10, 1790, and Article One on September 21, 1791
 Rhode Island: Articles One and Three through Twelve on June 7, 1790, and Article Two on June 10, 1993
 Vermont: Articles One through Twelve on November 3, 1791
 Virginia: Article One on November 3, 1791, and Articles Two through Twelve on December 15, 1791(After failing to ratify the 12 amendments during the 1789 legislative session.)

Having been approved by the requisite three-fourths of the several states, there being 14 States in the Union at the time (as Vermont had been admitted into the Union on March 4, 1791), the ratification of Articles Three through Twelve was completed and they became Amendments 1 through 10 of the Constitution. Congress, now meeting at Congress Hall in Philadelphia, was informed of this by President Washington on January 18, 1792.

As they had not yet been approved by 11 of the 14 states, the ratification of Article One (ratified by 10) and Article Two (ratified by 6) remained incomplete. The ratification plateau they needed to reach soon rose to 12 of 15 states when Kentucky joined the Union (June 1, 1792). On June 27, 1792, the Kentucky General Assembly ratified all 12 amendments, however this action did not come to light until 1996.

Article One came within one state of the number needed to become adopted into the Constitution on two occasions between 1789 and 1803. Despite coming close to ratification early on, it has never received the approval of enough states to become part of the Constitution. As Congress did not attach a ratification time limit to the article, it is still pending before the states. Since no state has approved it since 1792, ratification by an additional 27 states would now be necessary for the article to be adopted.

Article Two, initially ratified by seven states through 1792 (including Kentucky), was not ratified by another state for eighty years. The Ohio General Assembly ratified it on May 6, 1873 in protest of an unpopular Congressional pay raise. A century later, on March 6, 1978, the Wyoming Legislature also ratified the article. Gregory Watson, a University of Texas at Austin undergraduate student, started a new push for the article's ratification with a letter-writing campaign to state legislatures. As a result, by May 1992, enough states had approved Article Two (38 of the 50 states in the Union) for it to become the Twenty-seventh Amendment to the United States Constitution. The amendment's adoption was certified by Archivist of the United States Don W. Wilson and subsequently affirmed by a vote of Congress on May 20, 1992.

Three states did not complete action on the twelve articles of amendment when they were initially put before the states. Georgia found a Bill of Rights unnecessary and so refused to ratify. Both chambers of the Massachusetts General Court ratified a number of the amendments (the Senate adopted 10 of 12 and the House 9 of 12), but failed to reconcile their two lists or to send official notice to the Secretary of State of the ones they did agree upon. Both houses of the Connecticut General Assembly voted to ratify Articles Three through Twelve but failed to reconcile their bills after disagreeing over whether to ratify Articles One and Two. All three later ratified the Constitutional amendments originally known as Articles Three through Twelve as part of the 1939 commemoration of the Bill of Rights' sesquicentennial: Massachusetts on March 2, Georgia on March 18, and Connecticut on April 19. Connecticut and Georgia would also later ratify Article Two, on May 13, 1987 and February 2, 1988 respectively.

Application and text
The Bill of Rights had little judicial impact for the first 150 years of its existence; in the words of Gordon S. Wood, "After ratification, most Americans promptly forgot about the first ten amendments to the Constitution." The Court made no important decisions protecting free speech rights, for example, until 1931. Historian Richard Labunski attributes the Bill's long legal dormancy to three factors: first, it took time for a "culture of tolerance" to develop that would support the Bill's provisions with judicial and popular will; second, the Supreme Court spent much of the 19th century focused on issues relating to intergovernmental balances of power; and third, the Bill initially only applied to the federal government, a restriction affirmed by Barron v. Baltimore (1833). In the 20th century, however, most of the Bill's provisions were applied to the states via the Fourteenth Amendment—a process known as incorporation—beginning with the freedom of speech clause, in Gitlow v. New York (1925). In Talton v. Mayes (1896), the Court ruled that constitutional protections, including the provisions of the Bill of Rights, do not apply to the actions of American Indian tribal governments. Through the incorporation process the Supreme Court succeeded in extending to the states almost all of the protections in the Bill of Rights, as well as other, unenumerated rights. The Bill of Rights thus imposes legal limits on the powers of governments and acts as an anti-majoritarian/minoritarian safeguard by providing deeply entrenched legal protection for various civil liberties and fundamental rights. The Supreme Court for example concluded in the West Virginia State Board of Education v. Barnette (1943) case that the founders intended the Bill of Rights to put some rights out of reach from majorities, ensuring that some liberties would endure beyond political majorities. As the Court noted, the idea of the Bill of Rights "was to withdraw certain subjects from the vicissitudes of political controversy, to place them beyond the reach of majorities and officials and to establish them as legal principles to be applied by the courts." This is why "fundamental rights may not be submitted to a vote; they depend on the outcome of no elections."

First Amendment

The First Amendment prohibits the making of any law respecting an establishment of religion, impeding the free exercise of religion, abridging the freedom of speech, infringing on the freedom of the press, interfering with the right to peaceably assemble or prohibiting the petitioning for a governmental redress of grievances. Initially, the First Amendment applied only to laws enacted by Congress, and many of its provisions were interpreted more narrowly than they are today.

In Everson v. Board of Education (1947), the Court drew on Thomas Jefferson's correspondence to call for "a wall of separation between church and State", though the precise boundary of this separation remains in dispute. Speech rights were expanded significantly in a series of 20th- and 21st-century court decisions that protected various forms of political speech, anonymous speech, campaign financing, pornography, and school speech; these rulings also defined a series of exceptions to First Amendment protections. The Supreme Court overturned English common law precedent to increase the burden of proof for libel suits, most notably in New York Times Co. v. Sullivan (1964). Commercial speech is less protected by the First Amendment than political speech, and is therefore subject to greater regulation.

The Free Press Clause protects publication of information and opinions, and applies to a wide variety of media. In Near v. Minnesota (1931) and New York Times v. United States (1971), the Supreme Court ruled that the First Amendment protected against prior restraint—pre-publication censorship—in almost all cases. The Petition Clause protects the right to petition all branches and agencies of government for action. In addition to the right of assembly guaranteed by this clause, the Court has also ruled that the amendment implicitly protects freedom of association.

Second Amendment

The Second Amendment protects the individual right to keep and bear arms. The concept of such a right existed within English common law long before the enactment of the Bill of Rights. First codified in the English Bill of Rights of 1689 (but there only applying to Protestants), this right was enshrined in fundamental laws of several American states during the Revolutionary era, including the 1776 Virginia Declaration of Rights and the Pennsylvania Constitution of 1776. Long a controversial issue in American political, legal, and social discourse, the Second Amendment has been at the heart of several Supreme Court decisions.
 In United States v. Cruikshank (1876), the Court ruled that "[t]he right to bear arms is not granted by the Constitution; neither is it in any manner dependent upon that instrument for its existence. The Second Amendment means no more than that it shall not be infringed by Congress, and has no other effect than to restrict the powers of the National Government."
 In United States v. Miller (1939), the Court ruled that the amendment "[protects arms that had a] reasonable relationship to the preservation or efficiency of a well regulated militia".
 In District of Columbia v. Heller (2008), the Court ruled that the Second Amendment "codified a pre-existing right" and that it "protects an individual right to possess a firearm unconnected with service in a militia, and to use that arm for traditionally lawful purposes, such as self-defense within the home" but also stated that "the right is not unlimited. It is not a right to keep and carry any weapon whatsoever in any manner whatsoever and for whatever purpose".
 In McDonald v. Chicago (2010), the Court ruled that the Second Amendment limits state and local governments to the same extent that it limits the federal government.

Third Amendment

The Third Amendment restricts the quartering of soldiers in private homes, in response to Quartering Acts passed by the British parliament during the Revolutionary War. The amendment is one of the least controversial of the Constitution, and, has never been the primary basis of a Supreme Court decision.

Fourth Amendment

The Fourth Amendment guards against unreasonable searches and seizures, along with requiring any warrant to be judicially sanctioned and supported by probable cause. It was adopted as a response to the abuse of the writ of assistance, which is a type of general search warrant, in the American Revolution. Search and seizure (including arrest) must be limited in scope according to specific information supplied to the issuing court, usually by a law enforcement officer who has sworn by it. The amendment is the basis for the exclusionary rule, which mandates that evidence obtained illegally cannot be introduced into a criminal trial. The amendment's interpretation has varied over time; its protections expanded under left-leaning courts such as that headed by Earl Warren and contracted under right-leaning courts such as that of William Rehnquist.

Fifth Amendment

The Fifth Amendment protects against double jeopardy and self-incrimination and guarantees the rights to due process, grand jury screening of criminal indictments, and compensation for the seizure of private property under eminent domain. The amendment was the basis for the court's decision in Miranda v. Arizona (1966), which established that defendants must be informed of their rights to an attorney and against self-incrimination prior to interrogation by police; the Miranda warning.

Sixth Amendment

The Sixth Amendment establishes a number of rights of the defendant in a criminal trial:
 to a speedy and public trial
 to trial by an impartial jury
 to be informed of criminal charges
 to confront witnesses
 to compel witnesses to appear in court
 to assistance of counsel

In Gideon v. Wainwright (1963), the Court ruled that the amendment guaranteed the right to legal representation in all felony prosecutions in both state and federal courts.

Seventh Amendment

The Seventh Amendment guarantees jury trials in federal civil cases that deal with claims of more than twenty dollars. It also prohibits judges from overruling findings of fact by juries in federal civil trials. In Colgrove v. Battin (1973), the Court ruled that the amendment's requirements could be fulfilled by a jury with a minimum of six members. The Seventh is one of the few parts of the Bill of Rights not to be incorporated (applied to the states).

Eighth Amendment

The Eighth Amendment forbids the imposition of excessive bails or fines, though it leaves the term "excessive" open to interpretation. The most frequently litigated clause of the amendment is the last, which forbids cruel and unusual punishment. This clause was only occasionally applied by the Supreme Court prior to the 1970s, generally in cases dealing with means of execution. In Furman v. Georgia (1972), some members of the Court found capital punishment itself in violation of the amendment, arguing that the clause could reflect "evolving standards of decency" as public opinion changed; others found certain practices in capital trials to be unacceptably arbitrary, resulting in a majority decision that effectively halted executions in the United States for several years. Executions resumed following Gregg v. Georgia (1976), which found capital punishment to be constitutional if the jury was directed by concrete sentencing guidelines. The Court has also found that some poor prison conditions constitute cruel and unusual punishment, as in Estelle v. Gamble (1976) and Brown v. Plata (2011).

Ninth Amendment

The Ninth Amendment declares that there are additional fundamental rights that exist outside the Constitution. The rights enumerated in the Constitution are not an explicit and exhaustive list of individual rights. It was rarely mentioned in Supreme Court decisions before the second half of the 20th century, when it was cited by several of the justices in Griswold v. Connecticut (1965). The Court in that case voided a statute prohibiting use of contraceptives as an infringement of the right of marital privacy. This right was, in turn, the foundation upon which the Supreme Court built decisions in several landmark cases, including, Roe v. Wade (1973), which overturned a Texas law making it a crime to assist a woman to get an abortion, and Planned Parenthood v. Casey (1992), which invalidated a Pennsylvania law that required spousal awareness prior to obtaining an abortion.

Tenth Amendment

The Tenth Amendment reinforces the principles of separation of powers and federalism by providing that powers not granted to the federal government by the Constitution, nor prohibited to the states, are reserved to the states or the people. The amendment provides no new powers or rights to the states, but rather preserves their authority in all matters not specifically granted to the federal government nor explicitly forbidden to the states.

Display and honoring of the Bill of Rights
George Washington had fourteen handwritten copies of the Bill of Rights made, one for Congress and one for each of the original thirteen states. The copies for Georgia, Maryland, New York, and Pennsylvania went missing. The New York copy is thought to have been destroyed in a fire. Two unidentified copies of the missing four (thought to be the Georgia and Maryland copies) survive; one is in the National Archives, and the other is in the New York Public Library. North Carolina's copy was stolen from the State Capitol by a Union soldier following the Civil War. In an FBI sting operation, it was recovered in 2003. The copy retained by the First Congress has been on display (along with the Constitution and the Declaration of Independence) in the Rotunda for the Charters of Freedom room at the National Archives Building in Washington, D.C. since December 13, 1952.

After fifty years on display, signs of deterioration in the casing were noted, while the documents themselves appeared to be well preserved. Accordingly, the casing was updated and the Rotunda rededicated on September 17, 2003. In his dedicatory remarks, President George W. Bush stated, "The true [American] revolution was not to defy one earthly power, but to declare principles that stand above every earthly power—the equality of each person before God, and the responsibility of government to secure the rights of all."

In 1941, President Franklin D. Roosevelt declared December 15 to be Bill of Rights Day, commemorating the 150th anniversary of the ratification of the Bill of Rights. In 1991, the Virginia copy of the Bill of Rights toured the country in honor of its bicentennial, visiting the capitals of all fifty states.

See also

 Anti-Federalism
 Constitutionalism in the United States
 Founding Fathers of the United States
 Four Freedoms
 Institute of Bill of Rights Law
 Patients' [bill of] rights
 Second Bill of Rights
 States' rights
 Substantive due process
 Taxpayer Bill of Rights
 Universal Declaration of Human Rights
 Virginia Statute for Religious Freedom
 We Hold These Truths

Notes

References

Citations

Bibliography

Further reading

 
 
 Bordewich, Fergus M. The First Congress: How James Madison, George Washington, and a Group of Extraordinary Men Invented the Government (2016) on 1789–1791.
 Brant, Irving. The Bill of rights; its origin and meaning (1965) online
 Cogan, Neil H. (2015). The Complete Bill of Rights: The Drafts, Debates, Sources, and Origins. Second edition. New York: Oxford University Press.
 
 
 
 Stevens, John Paul.  "Keynote Address: The Bill of Rights: A Century of Progress." University of Chicago Law Review  59 (1992): 13+ online .

External links

 National Archives: The full text of the United States Bill of Rights
 Footnote.com (partners with the National Archives): Online viewer with High-resolution image of the original document
 Library of Congress: Bill of Rights and related resources
 Alexander Hamilton, Federalist, no. 84, 575–81, on opposition to the Bill of Rights
 TeachingAmericanHistory.org – Bill of Rights
 
 "President's Bill of Rights - We Hold These Truths" (Orson Welles on the Air, 1938–1946, full program, Indiana University Bloomington)

 
1st United States Congress
1791 in American politics
1791 in American law
Amendments to the United States Constitution
American Enlightenment
George Mason
James Madison
United States Bill of Rights
Government documents of the United States
Presidency of George Washington
Constitution of the United States